Ballynastaig Wood is a nature reserve of approximately  located in County Galway, Ireland.

History
Ballynastaig Wood Nature Reserve was legally protected by the Irish government in 1983. It is located close to Coole Park, and shares many of the same characteristics. The woods consist of ash, alder-hawthorn, and yew wood.

References

Geography of County Galway
Birdwatching sites in Ireland
Forests and woodlands of the Republic of Ireland
Nature reserves in the Republic of Ireland
Parks in County Galway
Tourist attractions in County Galway
Protected areas established in 1983
1983 establishments in Ireland